Keith Jeffreys (18 January 1921 – 16 May 2000) was an Australian cricketer. He played eight first-class matches for Western Australia between 1937/38 and 1939/40.

See also
 List of Western Australia first-class cricketers

References

External links
 

1921 births
2000 deaths
Australian cricketers
Western Australia cricketers